The 2014–15 Süper Lig (known as the Spor Toto Süper Lig for sponsorship reasons) was the 57th season of the Süper Lig, the highest tier football league of Turkey.

The season was named after former Beşiktaş club president Süleyman Seba, who died in 2014.

Teams 
Elazığspor, Antalyaspor and Kayserispor were relegated at the end of the 2013–14 season after finishing in the bottom three places of the standings. Elazığspor was at top level for two years, while Antalyaspor and Kayserispor returned to second level after six and ten years, respectively. The relegated teams were replaced by 2013–14 TFF First League champions İstanbul Başakşehir, runners-up Balıkesirspor and play-off winners Mersin İdman Yurdu. They returned to the top division after 1, 38 and 1 years, respectively.

Stadia and locations

Personnel and sponsorship

Managerial changes

League table

Results

Positions by round 
The following table represents the teams position after each round in the competition.

Results by round
The following table represents the teams game results in each round.

Attendances 

Updated to games played on 30 May 2015.
Source:ntvspor 

Notes

Statistics

Top goalscorers

Top assists

Hat-tricks

4 Player scored 4 goals.

Clean sheets

Player

Club
 Most clean sheets: 16
 İstanbul Başakşehir

See also
 2014–15 Turkish Cup
 2014–15 TFF First League
 2014–15 TFF Second League
 2014–15 TFF Third League

References

External links
 

2014-15
Turk
1